Cathy Segal-Garcia (born May 28, 1953) is an American jazz singer. Segal-Garcia attended Berklee College of Music where she played flute and studied arranging and composition.

Discography 
 Point of View (1985)
 Song of the Heart (Whynot, 1991)
 Heart to Heart (1998)
 Alone Together (Koyo Sounds, 1998)
 Secret Life (Dash Hoffman, 2001)
 Day by Day with Joe Diorio  (Dash Hoffman, 2007)
 In2uition (Dash Hoffman, 2017)
 Dreamsville (Dash Hoffman, 2019)

References

External links
 Official site

1953 births
Living people
American jazz singers
Berklee College of Music alumni